Lightning, the White Stallion is a 1986 American drama film directed by William A. Levey and written by Harry Alan Towers. The film stars Mickey Rooney, Susan George, Isabel García Lorca, Billy Wesley, Martin Charles Warner and Françoise Pascal. The film was released in August 1986, by Cannon Film Distributors.

Plot
The horse of wealthy gambler Barney Ingram, Cloverdale III, is stolen by creditor Emmet Fallon.  The horse is eventually stabled and renamed Lightning, but under the condition that he will be trained by a young rider as a racing horse.

Cast 
 Mickey Rooney as Barney Ingram
 Susan George as Madame Rene
 Isabel García Lorca as Stephanie Ward
 Billy Wesley as Lucas Mitchell
 Martin Charles Warner as Emmett Fallon
 Françoise Pascal as Marie Ward Leeman
 Read Morgan as Harvey Leeman
 Stanley Siegel as Jim Piper
 Jay Rasumny as Johnny
 Debra Berger as Lili Castle
 Murray Langston as Gorman
 Richard Lundin as Max 
 Justin Lundin as Wiley
 Charles Pitt as Judge
 Sheila Colligan as Registrar
 Karen Davis as Melinda
 Claudia Stenke as Danielle
 Rob Gage as himself
 Jennifer Young as Rob Gage's Girlfriend
 Shannon McLeod as Daphne
 William A. Levey as Ophthalmologist
 John Warren James as Mailman
 Bradley C. Golden as Neighbor
 Ayanna DuLaney as Nurse

References

External links 
 

1986 films
1980s English-language films
American drama films
1986 drama films
Films about horses
Golan-Globus films
1980s American films